Van den Heever is an Afrikaans surname. Notable people with the surname include:

 C. M. van den Heever (1902–1957), South African poet and writer
 Elza van den Heever (born 1979) South African soprano
F. P. 'Toon' van den Heever (1894–1956), South African poet and judge
 Gerhard van den Heever (born 1989), South African rugby union player
 Jennifer Van den Heever (born 1962) Namibian politician
 Martin van der Heever (born 1990) South African rugby union player

Anroux van den heever (born 2011) South African rugby union player

Afrikaans-language surnames
Surnames of Dutch origin